Nesles is a commune in the Pas-de-Calais department in the Hauts-de-France region of France.

Geography
The A16 autoroute cuts through the middle of the commune's territory.

Population

Places of interest
 The church of Notre-Dame, dating from the sixteenth century.
 The sixteenth century fortified manorhouse of la Haye.
 Mont Romain, a feudal motte with a moat.

See also
Communes of the Pas-de-Calais department

References

Communes of Pas-de-Calais